Woo Won-shik (born 18 September 1957) is a South Korean politician in the liberal Democratic Party of Korea, who has been a member of the National Assembly for Nowon, Seoul, since 2012. He previously represented the same constituency between 2004 and 2008.

Early life

Woo was born in Seoul in 1957 and studied civil engineering at Yonsei University, later receiving a master's degree in environmental studies from the same university. He was arrested and sentenced to three years of penal labor under the Chun Doo-hwan regime in 1981 for taking part in protests demanding Chun's resignation.

Political career

Woo was elected to the National Assembly in 2004 as an Uri Party candidate in the Nowon B constituency in Seoul. Early in his Assembly career, Woo pressed for the abolition of South Korea's National Security Law, and attacked the Supreme Court in 2004 for backing the permanence of the law. Later, in 2007, he criticized the U.S. armed forces in Korea for the poor environmental conditions on American military bases. He ran unsuccessfully for chairman of the United New Democratic Party in the leadership election on 10 January 2008, losing to Sohn Hak-kyu. He lost his seat in the 2008 elections, but stood successfully in the next elections in 2012.

As an assemblyman, Woo has been active in promoting labor rights. He is a member of the Assembly's Environment and Labor Committee. In 2007, he presided over the unanimous approval of a bill to allow academics at private universities to organize unions. Following his re-entry to the Assembly, in 2013 he established the Committee for Improving the Standing of the Have-Nots or "Euljiro Committee", a group that mediates industrial disputes and works to protect workers' rights. He has served as the Committee's chairman since its founding.

Woo has served in a number of important positions in the Democratic Party and its predecessors, including deputy floor leader and deputy secretary general. He is seen as independent of the party's pro–Roh Moo-hyun and Jeolla factions. Woo also acted as opposition administrator of the special hearing committee to vet the appointment of Hwang Kyo-ahn as Prime Minister in May–June 2015, with the Dong-A Ilbo describing him at this time as having a "strong, steely character".

References

1957 births
Living people
Members of the National Assembly (South Korea)
Minjoo Party of Korea politicians
People from Seoul
Yonsei University alumni
Danyang U clan